Argyresthia kasyi is a moth of the family Yponomeutidae. It is found in the Republic of Macedonia.

References

Moths described in 1963
Argyresthia
Moths of Europe